The Best Selection of First Moritaka 1987–1993 is a compilation album by Japanese singer/songwriter Chisato Moritaka, released on February 15, 1999. The album covers Moritaka's singles from 1987 to 1993. It was released prior to her marriage to actor Yōsuke Eguchi on June 3 and her subsequent retirement from the music industry.

The album peaked at No. 6 on Oricon's albums chart and sold over 74,000 copies.

Track listing 
All lyrics are written by Chisato Moritaka, except where indicated; all music is composed and arranged by Hideo Saitō, except where indicated.

Charts

References

External links 
 
 

1999 compilation albums
Chisato Moritaka compilation albums
Japanese-language compilation albums
Warner Music Japan compilation albums